Landsberg am Lech is a Landkreis (district) in Bavaria, Germany. It is bounded by (from the north and clockwise) the districts of Aichach-Friedberg, Fürstenfeldbruck, Starnberg, Weilheim-Schongau, Ostallgäu and Augsburg.

History 

In 1180 the lands east of the Lech river fell to the Wittelsbach dynasty of Bavaria; the lands on the western bank were acquired about 1315.

The district of Landsberg was established in 1938 as the successor of another entity (Bezirksamt) of the same name. In the administrative reform of 1972 the district received its present shape.

In the final stages of World War II, the German Armaments Ministry and the SS established the Kaufering concentration camp, including 11 subcamps in the general area of Landsberg and Kaufering. It was set up as a subcamp of Dachau. At the end of April in 1945, the SS evacuated or destroyed what they could before the Allies arrived. A dramatization of the discovery and liberation of the camp was presented in Episode 9: Why We Fight of the Band of Brothers mini-series in the year 2001. The historical information, film and foto material were given by Anton Posset to the film producer Steven Spielberg and Tom Hanks.

Geography

State 
The administrative district lies in the west of Upper Bavaria and borders there on the administrative district Swabia (Bavaria). It comprises 31 municipalities with a total area of 804 km². The district is dominated by the Lech with its numerous barrages, the Ammersee, the rural communities in the south reaching as far as the foothills of the Alps and the large district town of Landsberg am Lech situated at the junction of the Bundesautobahn 96 (Munich-Lindau) with the Bundesstraße 17 (Augsburg-Füssen-Austria). The lowest point is Unterbergen (521 metres), the highest is Sachsenrieder Forst near Dietlried (853 metres).

The district has a share in the natural areas of Lechfeld, Ammersee and Pfaffenwinkel.

Land use 
Settlement and traffic areas in the district account for 11.1% of the total area. Agricultural land accounts for 82.2% of the total area of the district, 54.2% of which is agricultural land and 28% forest land. While the north of the district is relatively poor in forests, the southern part has a high proportion of forest areas and large closed forest areas, such as the Sachsenrieder Forst and the Forst Bayerdießen.

Language border 
The Bavarian-Alemannic language border runs through the district, essentially along the Lech. Within a few kilometers there are often clear differences in the local dialect.

The Lechrainer dialect is characteristic of the district.

Neighbouring districts 
The administrative district borders clockwise in the north beginning with the administrative districts Aichach-Friedberg, Fürstenfeldbruck, Starnberg, Weilheim-Schongau, Ostallgäu and Augsburg.

Coat of arms 
The coat of arms displays:
 the blue and white checked pattern of Bavaria
 the eagle was the heraldic animal of the county of Dießen-Andechs, which possessed the lands east of the Lech river before the 12th century
 the lion stands for Henry the Lion, who was the founder of the city of Landsberg

Towns and municipalities

References

External links 

  European Holocaust Memorial - a monument ensemble against racism and totalitarianism at the place of the crime - under the executive management of the Citizens´ Association European Holocaust Memorial Foundation
  
Kaufering.com an online memorial to the victims of the Kaufering death camps and their liberators.
 The Holocaust in the Landsberg area - Citizens´ Association "Landsberg in the 20th Century" (English)

 
Districts of Bavaria